Escadron de Ravitaillement en Vol 4/31 Sologne is a French Air and Space Force (Armée de l'air et de l'espace) Air Refueling Squadron located at Istres-Le Tubé Air Base, Bouches-du-Rhône, France which operates the Boeing C-135FR Stratolifter.

See also

 List of French Air and Space Force aircraft squadrons

References

French Air and Space Force squadrons